Lo Boièr ("The Oxherd", also known as Le Bouvier in French) is an Occitan traditional song. It was popular in Languedoc during the Late Middle Ages, being particularly associated to the religious movement of Catharism. It might have developed during the Albigensian Crusade, when Cathar beliefs were declared forbidden.

Along with Se Canta, it is possibly the most known old Occitan song. It was studied by Gérard de Sède and performed by artists like Corou de Berra, Jean-Bernard Plantevin, André Ricros and Gacha Empega. It was also utilized by Radio Toulouse during World War I as a resistance song.

Characteristics
Lo Boièr is a song with a slow, alternate rhythm. The third verse of every stanza is a mantric-sounding succession of vowels as a sort of refrain. The song's lyrics tells the story of an oxherd who finds his wife ill and tries to comfort her with food, which the woman replies to by serenely explaining the way she wants to be buried after she dies.

The song's imagery is rooted in Cathar symbolism. The oxherd's wife is named Joana, a female version of the name given to Cathar believers before entering spiritual life, and is described as "disconsolate," implying she has not received the rite of consolamentum yet. The meal mentioned contains a radish ("raba", in Occitan), a cabbage ("caulet") and a lean lark ("magra"), referencing the noble families of Rabastens, Caulet and Magrin, protectors of Catharism. Finally, Joana asks to be buried with her head under the fountain, symbolizing the water received in the consolamentum, and mentions a herd of goats, echoing a Gnostic tradition that links Capricorn to the spirit's return to heaven.

In Gnosticism, the vowels are considered a form of the name of the Monad, much like the Hebrew tetragrammaton. Examples of this and similar vowel usage is found in the Nag Hamadi Library. Some have suggested that they form a phonic pyramid pointing to heaven.  Others believe its true meaning is lost.

Lyrics 
The following is the most popular form of the song's lyrics.

In popular culture
In his 1998 novel Le Christi, René-Victor Pilhes mentions the song, interpreting its vowels as Austriae est imperare orbi universo.

References

External links
 Lo Boièr performed by Hans-André Stamm
 Lo Boièr performed by Indigo Aura

Occitania
Old Occitan literature
Occitan music
Catharism
Gnosticism
Christian music
Medieval music genres
Western medieval lyric forms